rESONANCE is a compilation album by haloblack, self-released on July 15, 1992. The album comprises a collection of demos that were recorded in 1992 with the intention of being part of the band's debut Tension Filter.

Track listing

Personnel 
Adapted from the rESONANCE liner notes.

haloblack
 Bryan Barton (as Bryan Black) – vocals, instruments, production

Release history

References

External links 
 
 rESONANCE at Bandcamp
 

1992 compilation albums
haloblack albums